Blut Aus Nord is a French black metal band from Mondeville, Calvados, that has incorporated avant-garde elements in its music.

History
Vindsval began a solo project, under the name "Vlad", in 1993. He released two demos before changing the project's name in 1994 to Blut aus Nord, before the release of Ultima Thulée in 1995. The next three albums were recorded with the aid of session musicians. It is only recently that the group has had any permanent members apart from Vindsval.

The project's most critically acclaimed release is The Work Which Transforms God, a concept album which, in spite of being mostly instrumental with none of the lyrics made public, is meant to challenge the listener's prejudices and preconceptions about reality and various metaphysical subjects. The album was named by Terrorizer Magazine as one of its top 10 albums of 2003. So far, Vindsval has only allowed the lyrics from one of Blut aus Nord's full-length releases, Memoria Vetusta I, to be made public. According to journalist Avi Pitchon, "Blut Aus Nord are responsible, perhaps more so than any band, for the most recent evolution within black metal. 2003's 'The Work Which Transforms God' introduced us to the warped, collapsing mutation of 'black hole metal'; nowadays also called shoegazing BM."

Vindsval is head of the underground French record label Appease Me..., which is home to several extreme metal acts, in addition to Blut aus Nord.

On their follow-up release, 2006's MoRT, Blut aus Nord moved even further away from traditional black metal. The sound on MoRT is closer to experimental metal, comprising a mixture of dark and surreal noises and sounds that create a disturbing and bleak atmosphere.

Blut aus Nord's 2007 album Odinist: The Destruction of Reason by Illumination (the subtitle being a quote from Aleister Crowley), was leaked to the Internet on 10 September 2007. While the album's superficial sound is similar to that of MoRT, the album demonstrates a return to more traditional black metal songwriting and structure.

The sequel to Memoria Vetusta I, subtitled Dialogue with the Stars, was released in February 2009. In June 2010 they released an LP entitled What Once Was... Liber I on Debemur Morti Productions. In late 2010, the band re-released The Mystical Beast of Rebellion through Debemur Morti, with an additional CD of newly recorded material meant to act as a complementary work to the original.

The name "Blut aus Nord" translates from German as "Blood from the North", though the non-standard grammar suggests nautical jargon (a more standard phrasing would be "Blut aus (dem) Norden" or "Blut von Nord(en)", though cardinal directions are seldom used in spoken German to begin with).

They released a split EP with Ævangelist in June 2016 through Debemur Morti Productions. Two new albums, Deus Salutis Meæ and Hallucinogen, were released in 2017 and 2019 respectively. Loudwire named the latter one of the 50 best metal albums of 2019.

Musical style and conceptual elements
Blut Aus Nord's work has been described as the "sonic equivalent to Thorns injecting Streetcleaner-era Godflesh with an evil unpredictability". Vindsval, the vocalist and guitarist, made the following statement:

In addition to rejecting Satanism, BAN have distanced themselves from nationalism - another common black metal theme - instead recognising a kinship with "environmentalist black metal" groups such as Wolves in the Throne Room.

Current line-up
Vindsval - guitar, vocals (1993-)
W.D. Feld - drums, electronics, keyboards (1994-)
GhÖst - bass (2003-)
Thorns - drums (2014-)

Discography
Studio albums
Ultima Thulée (1995)
Memoria Vetusta I – Fathers of the Icy Age (1996)
The Mystical Beast of Rebellion (2001)
The Work Which Transforms God (2003)
MoRT (2006)
Odinist: The Destruction of Reason by Illumination (2007)
Memoria Vetusta II – Dialogue with the Stars (2009)
777 – Sect(s) (2011)
777 – The Desanctification (2011)
777 – Cosmosophy (2012)
 Memoria Vetusta III: Saturnian Poetry (2014)
 Deus Salutis Meæ (2017)
 Hallucinogen (2019)
 Disharmonium – Undreamable Abysses (2022)
 Lovecraftian Echoes (2022)
EPs
Thematic Emanation of Archetypal Multiplicity (2005)
Dissociated Human Junction (2007)
What Once Was... Liber I (2010)
What Once Was... Liber II (2012)
What Once Was... Liber III (2013)
Debemur MoRTi (2014)
Triunity (2014)

Split releases
Decorporation 10 (2004) – split with Reverence
Dissociated Human Junction (2007) – split with Bloodoline, Reverence, and Karras
Triunity (2014) – split with P.H.O.B.O.S.
Codex Obscura Nomina (2016) – split with Ævangelist

References

External links
 Facebook page
 Biography on Allmusic

French black metal musical groups
Avant-garde metal musical groups
French industrial metal musical groups
Post-metal musical groups
Musical groups established in 1994
1994 establishments in France
Musical groups from Normandy
Candlelight Records artists